Membrane-associated guanylate kinase, WW and PDZ domain-containing protein 1 is an enzyme that in humans is encoded by the MAGI1 gene.

Function 

The protein encoded by this gene is a member of the membrane-associated guanylate kinase homologue (MAGUK) family. MAGUK proteins participate in the assembly of multiprotein complexes on the inner surface of the plasma membrane at regions of cell–cell contact. The product of this gene may play a role as scaffolding protein at cell–cell junctions. Alternatively spliced transcript variants encoding different isoforms have been identified.

Interactions 

MAGI1 has been shown to interact with:
 ACCN3,
 ATN1, 
 Actinin alpha 4, 
 Beta-catenin, 
 Brain-specific angiogenesis inhibitor 1,
 Calcium-activated potassium channel subunit alpha-1,
 FCHSD2, 
 LRP2,  and
 SYNPO.

References

Further reading